"Destiny -The Lovers-" is the fifth single by Versailles, released on October 27, 2010. This is the band's first single to feature new bassist Masashi. The single came in three editions: a regular with just the CD and two limited editions each with a different cover and DVD. The first included live performances from their concert at Tokyo's JCB Hall on April 30, 2010, the other has the promotional video for the title track. The version that appears on Holy Grail has an orchestrated intro.

Track listing

References 

Versailles (band) songs
2010 singles
2010 songs
Songs written by Kamijo (musician)
Warner Music Japan singles